Cytotherapy may refer to 
 Cell therapy describing the process of introducing new cells into a tissue in order to treat a disease.
 Cytotherapy (journal) a medical journal, the official journal of the International Society for Cellular Therapy.